Olaf Engelhardt (born 2 March 1951) is a German sailor. He won a bronze medal in the Soling Class with Dieter Below and Michael Zachries at the 1976 Summer Olympics in Montreal.

References

1951 births
Living people
Sportspeople from Berlin
People from East Berlin
German male sailors (sport)
Sailors at the 1980 Summer Olympics – Star
Olympic sailors of East Germany
Olympic bronze medalists for East Germany
Olympic medalists in sailing
Sailors at the 1976 Summer Olympics – Soling
Medalists at the 1976 Summer Olympics
European Champions Soling